Rudolf Červený (born August 6, 1989) is a Czech professional ice hockey player who is currently playing with Admiral Vladivostok in the Kontinental Hockey League (KHL).

Playing career
He made his professional debut playing with hometown club, HC České Budějovice in the Czech Extraliga during the 2006–07 Czech Extraliga season.

Červený then played two North American major junior season for Regina Pats of the Western Hockey League, before returning to his native Czech Republic undrafted, and returning to České Budějovice and playing on loan with HC Tábor and IHC Písek.

After 5 seasons with Mountfield HK, Červený opted to pause his Extraliga career, opting to sign a one-year contract with Slovakian club, HC Slovan Bratislava of the Kontinental Hockey League (KHL) on May 31, 2018. In the 2018–19 season, Červený was used in a top-line role, placing second on the team in scoring with 23 points in 57 games. With Slovan failing to make the post-season, Červený left to the complete the season with Swedish playoff bound, Brynäs IF of the SHL, on February 14, 2019.

After a solitary season in the Finnish Liiga with the Lahti Pelicans in 2020–21, Červený returned to the KHL in signing a one-year contract with Latvian-based club, Dinamo Riga, on 31 May 2021.

Červený registered 7 goals and 12 points through 32 regular season games in the 2021–22 season for Dinamo Riga, finishing out of playoff contention. Červený extended his season by returning to the Finnish Liiga, in signing with Oulun Kärpät on 1 March 2022.

Returning to the KHL for the 2022–23 season, Červený was signed to a one-year contract in joining Admiral Vladivostok on 27 July 2022.

References

External links

1989 births
Living people
Admiral Vladivostok players
Brynäs IF players
Czech expatriate ice hockey players in Canada
Czech ice hockey forwards
Dinamo Riga players
HC Kometa Brno players
Lahti Pelicans players
BK Mladá Boleslav players
Motor České Budějovice players
IHC Písek players
Regina Pats players
HC Slovan Bratislava players
Sportspeople from České Budějovice
Stadion Hradec Králové players
HC Tábor players
Czech expatriate sportspeople in Latvia
Czech expatriate ice hockey players in Finland
Expatriate ice hockey players in Latvia
Czech expatriate ice hockey players in Slovakia
Czech expatriate ice hockey players in Sweden